Hindi Ko Kayang Iwan Ka (International title: Stay With Me / Lit: I Can Not Leave You) is a 2018 Philippine television drama series starring Yasmien Kurdi, Mike Tan, Martin del Rosario and Jackie Rice. The series premiered on GMA Network's GMA Afternoon Prime block and worldwide on GMA Pinoy TV from February 26 to August 31, 2018, replacing Haplos.

NUTAM (Nationwide Urban Television Audience Measurement) People in Television Homes ratings are provided by AGB Nielsen Philippines. The series ended, but its the 26th-week run, and with a total of 132 episodes. It was replaced by My Special Tatay.

Series overview

List of Episodes

February 2018

March 2018

April 2018

May 2018

June 2018

July 2018

August 2018

References

Lists of Philippine drama television series episodes